Blieux is a rural commune in the Alpes-de-Haute-Provence department in the Provence-Alpes-Côte d'Azur region in Southeastern France. In 2019, it had a population of 57.

History
The commune of Blieux first appeared on maps in 1100.

Much later, during the French Revolution, records show that the residents of Blieux had created a political club (patriotic society), which was very common at the time. (See Jacobin Club).

Name of the commune
According to Ernest Nègre, the first recorded name for the commune, Bleus, was derived from the Occitan word bleusse, meaning 'dry'. This was likely a reference to the local soil. By contrast, Charles Rostaing argues that the name derives from the pre-Indo-European root word, *BL, meaning 'mountain in the form of a spur'.

La Melle, the name of a nearby hamlet, comes from the Celtic word, mello, meaning an elevated location.

Economy
Historically, Blieux was a pastoral community, with a yearly alpine grazing cycle known as transhumance. As with much of Provence, tourism the primary source of economic activity today.

Geography
The village is located at an altitude of 950m, in the valley formed by a tributary of the river Asse, known as the 'Asse de Blieux'.

Hamlets
 le Bas-Chadoul
 la Melle
 la Tuilière
 Thon
 La Castelle

Summits and passes
 Mont Chiran (1905 m)
 le Grand Mourre (1898 m)
 Crête de Montmuye (Montmuye ridge) (Highest point: 1621 m)
 Le Mourre de Chanier ( 1930 m)

Demographics

With the exception of those that have been totally abandoned, Blieux is one of the communities in the Alpes-de-Haute-Provence department that has experienced the greatest population decline from the mid-19th to the mid-20th centuries.

Inhabitants are known as Blieuxois (masculine) and Blieuxoises (feminine).

See also
Communes of the Alpes-de-Haute-Provence department

References

Communes of Alpes-de-Haute-Provence